CTV News is the news division of the CTV Television Network in Canada. The name CTV News is also applied as the title of local and regional newscasts on the network's owned-and-operated stations (O&Os), which are closely tied to the national news division. Local newscasts on CTV 2 are also branded as CTV News, although in most cases they are managed separately from the newscasts on the main CTV network.

National programs

CTV's national news division produces the following programs which air on the main CTV network:

 CTV National News, the nightly newscast anchored by Omar Sachedina (weekdays) and Sandie Rinaldo (weekends);
 W5, a weekly newsmagazine series; and
 Question Period, a weekly news and interview series.

CTV News also operates the national 24-hour news channel CTV News Channel and the 24-hour national business news channel BNN Bloomberg, both of which are available across Canada on cable and satellite.

The news division produced the weekday morning news and entertainment program Canada AM from 1972 to October 2015, when responsibility for the program was transferred to Bell Media In-House Productions, the division responsible for CTV's other daytime lifestyle programming, until the program's cancellation in June 2016. Canada AM'''s replacement Your Morning is produced by Bell Media In-House Productions (now Bell Media Studios), with news content provided by CTV News.

Local programs

In most markets, local CTV News programs air at noon, 6 p.m., and 11:00 p.m. (CTV 2) or 11:30 p.m. (CTV) on weekdays, and at 6 p.m. and 11:00 p.m. / 11:30 p.m. on weekends. In selected markets, 5:00 and/or 5:30 p.m. newscasts are also produced, and several CTV stations in western Canada (and some CTV Two stations in eastern Canada) produce local morning newscasts under the title CTV Morning Live.

In 1998, shortly following the merger of the CTV network with Baton Broadcasting, local news branding on the CTV O&Os was unified with network news presentation, with newscast titles standardized under the format "(call sign) News", e.g. CFTO News for the Toronto station. Prior to this, the local O&Os used various titles, though one used in the late 1970s by a number of stations was World Beat News (for late-afternoon broadcasts) and Night Beat News (for late-night broadcasts). By late 2005 the O&Os' local newscasts had been renamed CTV News.

Beginning in February 2014, local programs were rebranded using region-specific on-air titles such as CTV News Toronto. At the same time, the CTV and CTV 2 O&O stations received a new graphics package, which is in a blue and white color scheme, a revised logo (similar to those already used on CTV News Channel and CTV National News), and new theme music. Starting in 2019, a red color scheme was added to the graphics package.

National aggregate ratings published by BBM Canada refer to the local broadcasts collectively as CTV Evening News, CTV Late News, CTV Noon News, etc., although these titles are not used on-air. Since most CTV affiliates are owned by the network, CTV offers the opportunity to buy national ads on local programming across its O&Os, making these aggregate ratings useful for advertisers.

Local CTV News programs are produced in the following markets:

 Barrie (CKVR) (in HD)
 Calgary (CFCN) (in HD)
 Edmonton (CFRN) (in HD)
 Greater Sudbury (CICI)
 Halifax (CJCH / CTV 2 Atlantic) (in HD)
 Kitchener (CKCO) (in HD)
 London (CFPL) (in HD)
 Montreal (CFCF) (in HD)
 Ottawa (CJOH / CHRO) (in HD)
 Regina (CKCK) (in HD)
 Saskatoon (CFQC) (in HD)
 Toronto (CFTO) (in HD)
 Vancouver (CIVT) (in HD)
 Victoria (CIVI) (in HD)
 Winnipeg (CKY) (in HD)
 Windsor (CHWI) (in HD)

CTV O&Os in smaller markets air a newscast produced in one of the larger markets noted above, although some may also produce a shorter local news insert aired during a break in the main market's program, and some of these smaller stations produce their own noon newscasts.

Through the purchase of CHUM Limited, Bell Media acquired A News which produced local newscasts mainly in smaller markets or alternate areas of larger markets. When the A system was rebranded as "CTV Two" on August 29, 2011 (and later CTV 2), its newscasts switched to the CTV News branding, likely because "CTV Two News" might be seen as connoting a second-class newscast. The CTV News broadcasts on the CTV 2 stations previously used the main CTV logo as their logo bug during these newscasts as did the main CTV network, but they currently use the regionally branded titles such as CTV News Barrie as is now the case for the CTV O&Os. Most of these stations are nevertheless required to separate their news operations from CTV stations in local and adjacent markets. This restriction does not apply to the cable-only channels CTV Two Atlantic, which has been co-owned with the local CTV stations since its launch (their news operations have been fully integrated since 1998), and CTV Two Alberta, which produces a current affairs program, Alberta Primetime, using resources from local CTV stations.

Independent affiliates also air their own local newscasts, such as NTV (which despite dropping CTV's entertainment programming in 2002, still provides coverage of Newfoundland for CTV News and airs its national newscasts), and CITL-TV (which airs Prime Time Local News, a production shared with its sister station, Global affiliate (now Citytv affiliate) CKSA-TV).

Bell Media also operates CP24, a regional news channel focusing on the Greater Toronto Area and most of Southern Ontario, which was acquired through the purchase of CHUM Limited, and formerly aligned with CITY-TV. The channel airs news programs focused on the region, and currently airs simulcasts of CFTO's 6:00 p.m. and 11:30 p.m. newscasts.

 News bureaus 
CTV News has bureaus across Canada and around the world, but many were closed to cut costs (most recently those in Moscow and Kampala) and replaced with reporters sent to locations from the existing bureaus.

A list of current bureaus:

 National 
 Halifax
Bureau Chief: Creeson Agecoutay
 Montreal
Bureau Chief: Geneviève Beauchemin
Reporters: Vanessa Lee
 Ottawa
Bureau Chief: Joyce Napier
Senior Political Correspondent: Glen McGregorPower Play Hosts: Vassy Kapelos (M-Th) and Joyce Napier (Fr)
Correspondents: Annie Bergeron-Oliver, Kevin Gallagher, and Judy Trinh 
 Toronto
Reporters: John Vennavally-Rao, Heather Wright, Heather Butts, and Adrian Ghobrial
 Winnipeg
Bureau Chief: Jill Macyshon
 Edmonton
Bureau Chief: Bill Fortier
 Vancouver
Bureau Chief: Melanie Nagy

International
 Washington - United States
Bureau Chief: Joy Malbon
Correspondent: Richard Madan
 Los Angeles - United States
Bureau Chief: Tom Walters
 London - Europe and Africa
Bureau Chief: Paul Workman
Reporter: Daniele Hamamdjian

 My News 

In 2008, the CTV News website introduced My News, a citizen journalism feature allowing citizens to upload their images or videos relating to current events. Viewers may also upload media for any station or program.

 NewsDay and NewsNight by CTV News NewsDay and NewsNight'' aired weekly on Quibi exclusively in Canada. It was hosted by Heather Butts and Reshmi Nair. Quibi was shut down on December 1, 2020.

References

External links
 

 
Bell Media
Quibi original programming
Television shows filmed in Calgary
Television shows filmed in Edmonton
Television shows filmed in Greater Sudbury
Television shows filmed in Halifax, Nova Scotia
Television shows filmed in Kitchener, Ontario
Television shows filmed in London, Ontario
Television shows filmed in Montreal
Television shows filmed in Ottawa
Television shows filmed in Regina, Saskatchewan
Television shows filmed in Saskatoon
Television shows filmed in Toronto
Television shows filmed in Vancouver
Television shows filmed in Victoria, British Columbia
Television shows filmed in Windsor, Ontario
Television shows filmed in Winnipeg
Culture of Barrie
1960s Canadian television news shows
1970s Canadian television news shows
1980s Canadian television news shows
1990s Canadian television news shows
2000s Canadian television news shows
2010s Canadian television news shows
2020s Canadian television news shows